Thavarumane Udugore is a 1991 Indian Kannada-language drama film directed by B. Subba Rao and produced by D. Rama Naidu under Suresh Productions. The film stars Sridhar, Sunil and Malashri. The film was a remake of the 1988 Rajasthani film Bai Chali Sasariye.

The film's music was composed by Upendra Kumar and the audio was launched on the Lahari Music banner.

Cast 

Malashri as Lakshmi
Sridhar
Sunil
Rajesh
Hema Choudhary
Viji Chandrasekhar
Srinath
Umashree
Vaishali Kasaravalli
Mysore Lokesh
Balaraj
Mandeep Roy
Keerthiraj
Veena

Soundtrack 
The music of the film was composed by Upendra Kumar, with lyrics by Chi. Udaya Shankar.

References 

1991 films
1990s Kannada-language films
Indian drama films
Films scored by Upendra Kumar
Kannada remakes of Rajasthani films
Films directed by B. A. Subba Rao
1991 drama films
Suresh Productions films